Livonia is one of the five multi-member constituencies of the Saeima, the national legislature of Latvia. The constituency was established in 1922 when the Saeima was established following Latvia's independence from the Soviet Union. It consists of the city of Jūrmala and municipalities of Ādaži, Alūksne, Cēsis, Gulbene, Ķekava, Limbaži, Madona, Mārupe, Ogre, Olaine, Ropaži, Salaspils, Saulkrasti, Sigulda, Smiltene, Valka, Valmiera and Varakļāni in the region of Livonia. The constituency currently elects 26 of the 100 members of the Saeima using the open party-list proportional representation electoral system. At the 2022 parliamentary election it had 396,278 registered electors.

Electoral system
Livonia currently elects 26 of the 100 members of the Saeima using the open party-list proportional representation electoral system. Constituency seats are allocated using the Sainte-Laguë method. Only parties that reach the 5% national threshold compete for constituency seats (4% in 1993).

Election results

Summary

Detailed

2020s

2022
Results of the 2022 parliamentary election held on 1 October 2022:

The following candidates were elected:
Hosams Abu Meri (JV), 63,414 votes; Česlavs Batņa (AS), 33,748 votes; Raimonds Bergmanis (AS), 41,201 votes; Kaspars Briškens (PRO), 20,008 votes; Andrejs Ceļapīters (JV), 61,967 votes; Raimonds Čudars (JV), 61,990 votes; Jānis Dombrava (NA), 34,045 votes; Raivis Dzintars (NA), 37,947 votes; Jānis Grasbergs (NA), 31,188 votes; Glorija Grevcova (S!), 10,610 votes; Juris Jakovins (ZZS), 32,845 votes; Krišjānis Kariņš (JV), 94,158 votes; Armands Krauze (ZZS), 35,822 votes; Ainars Latkovskis (JV), 69,100 votes; Linda Liepiņa (LPV), 15,486 votes; Daiga Mieriņa (ZZS), 32,771 votes; Uģis Mitrevics (NA), 36,428 votes; Harijs Rokpelnis (ZZS), 32,757 votes; Evika Siliņa (JV), 63,840 votes; Jana Simanovska (PRO), 16,764 votes; Jānis Skrastiņš (JV), 61,808 votes; Ričards Šlesers (LPV), 16,077 votes; Edvards Smiltēns (AS), 38,554 votes; Māris Sprindžuks (AS), 36,142 votes; Aiva Vīksna (AS), 33,599 votes; and Agita Zariņa-Stūre (JV), 60,947 votes.

2010s

2018
Results of the 2018 parliamentary election held on 6 October 2018:

The following candidates were elected:
Jānis Ādamsons (SDPS), 30,044 votes; Dagmāra Beitnere-Le Galla (JKP), 41,881 votes; Raimonds Bergmanis (ZZS), 35,225 votes; Aldis Blumbergs (KPV LV), 36,896 votes; Jānis Bordāns (JKP), 58,169 votes; Sergey Dolgopolov (SDPS), 31,863 votes; Jānis Dombrava (NA), 37,245 votes; Raivis Dzintars (NA), 44,654 votes; Inese Ikstena (AP), 34,354 votes; Ieva Krapāne (KPV LV), 36,442 votes; Armands Krauze (ZZS), 28,651 votes; Māris Kučinskis (ZZS), 37,227 votes; Ainars Latkovskis (JV), 19,927 votes; Inese Lībiņa-Egnere (JV), 20,292 votes; Linda Liepiņa (KPV LV), 44,662 votes; Anita Muižniece (JKP), 39,827 votes; Ināra Mūrniece (NA), 39,553 votes; Romāns Naudiņš (NA), 32,226 votes; Artis Pabriks (AP), 46,108 votes; Evija Papule (SDPS), 28,537 votes; Dace Rukšāne-Ščipčinska (AP), 34,080 votes; Andris Skride (AP), 37,355 votes; Karina Sprūde (KPV LV), 36,452 votes; Evita Zālīte-Grosa (JKP), 42,208 votes; and Normunds Žunna (JKP), 39,487 votes.

2014
Results of the 2014 parliamentary election held on 4 October 2014:

The following candidates were elected:
Jānis Ādamsons (SDPS), 35,892 votes; Inesis Boķis (V), 69,489 votes; Mārtiņš Bondars (LRA), 28,309 votes; Sergey Dolgopolov (SDPS), 39,399 votes; Jānis Dombrava (NA), 60,161 votes; Jānis Dūklavs (ZZS), 70,369 vots; Raivis Dzintars (NA), 75,742 votes; Vilnis Ķirsis (V), 65,544 votes; Rihards Kols (NA), 52,749 votes; Armands Krauze (ZZS), 56,360 votes; Kārlis Krēsliņš (NA), 53,297 votes; Gunārs Kūtris (NSL), 24,651 votes; Ainars Latkovskis (V), 71,873 votes; Ingmārs Līdaka (ZZS), 64,928 votes; Ainārs Mežulis (ZZS), 54,571 votes; Ināra Mūrniece (NA), 56,130 votes; Romāns Naudiņš (NA), 54,980 votes; Arvīds Platpers (NSL), 19,626 votes; Artis Rasmanis (ZZS), 55,077 votes; Romualds Ražuks (V), 65,393 votes; Jānis Ruks (LRA), 18,392 votes; Kārlis Šadurskis (V), 67,135 votes; Andris Siliņš (ZZS), 55,624 votes; Laimdota Straujuma (V), 83,124 votes; Jānis Upenieks (V), 67,205 votes; and Ivars Zariņš (SDPS), 34,113 votes.

2011
Results of the 2011 parliamentary election held on 17 September 2011:

The following candidates were elected:
Dzintars Ābiķis (V), 63,734 votes; Jānis Ādamsons (SC), 50,578 votes; Guntars Bilsēns (ZRP), 69,486 votes; Ilma Čepāne (V), 77,215 votes; Sergey Dolgopolov (SC), 54,957 votes; Jānis Dombrava (NA), 53,776 votes; Valdis Dombrovskis (V), 107,581 votes; Ina Druviete (V), 67,484 votes; Jānis Dūklavs (ZRP), 39,893 votes; Raivis Dzintars (NA), 72,036 votes; Iveta Grigule (ZZS), 33,330 votes; Viktors Jakovļevs (SC), 45,622 votes; Zanda Kalniņa-Lukaševica (ZRP), 69,844 votes; Ivans Klementjevs (SC), 50,015 votes; Kārlis Krēsliņš (NA), 47,861 votes; Ainars Latkovskis (V), 69,625 votes; Ingmārs Līdaka (ZZS), 38,885 votes; Ināra Mūrniece (NA), 49,079 votes; Romāns Naudiņš (NA), 47,921 votes; Artis Pabriks (V), 77,999 votes; Romualds Ražuks (ZRP), 71,744 votes; Gunārs Rusiņš (ZRP), 70,874 votes; Aleksandrs Sakovskis (SC), 45,246 votes; Elīna Siliņa (ZRP), 70,032 votes; Edvards Smiltēns (V), 63,728 votes; Jānis Upenieks (ZRP), 69,669 votes; and Valdis Zatlers (ZRP), 103,139 votes.

2010
Results of the 2010 parliamentary election held on 2 October 2010:

The following candidates were elected:
Dzintars Ābiķis (V), 109,241 votes; Jānis Ādamsons (SC), 45,059 votes; Arvils Ašeradens (V), 108,101 votes; Andris Bērziņš (ZZS), 58,339 votes; Ingmārs Čaklais (V), 106,899 votes; Ilma Čepāne (V), 129,137 votes; Jānis Dombrava (NA), 27,073 votes; Valdis Dombrovskis (V), 186,035 votes; Ina Druviete (V), 114,118 votes; Jānis Dūklavs (ZZS), 70,037 votes; Raivis Dzintars (NA), 41,653 votes; Guntars Galvanovskis (V), 107,578 votes; Iveta Grigule (ZZS), 59,639 votes; Dzintra Hirša (V), 107,293 votes; Ivans Klementjevs (SC), 46,549 votes; Armands Krauze (ZZS), 57,903 votes; Māris Kučinskis (PL), 17,660 votes; Visvaldis Lācis (NA), 30,432 votes; Ainars Latkovskis (V), 115,054 votes; Ingmārs Līdaka (ZZS), 72,858 votes; Artis Pabriks (V), 133,131 votes; Aleksandrs Sakovskis (SC), 40,750 votes; Juris Silovs (SC), 41,035 votes; Edvards Smiltēns (V), 109,389 votes; Vitauts Staņa (ZZS), 57,845 votes; Guntis Ulmanis (PL), 17,835 votes; and Andris Vilks (V), 110,669 votes.

2000s

2006
Results of the 2006 parliamentary election held on 7 October 2006:

The following candidates were elected:
Andris Bērziņš (LPP/LC), 19,712 votes; Gundars Bērziņš (TP), 67,621 votes; Helēna Demakova (TP), 69,567 votes; Oļegs Deņisovs (SC), 16,851 votes; Ina Druviete (JL), 61,858 votes; Indulis Emsis (ZZS), 48,012 votes; Ivars Godmanis (LPP/LC), 19,904 votes; Sandra Kalniete (JL), 71,307 votes; Imants Kalniņš (TB/LNNK), 21,165 votes; Aigars Kalvītis (TP), 85,637 votes; Ausma Kantāne-Ziedone (JL), 52,164 votes; Arturs Krišjānis Kariņš (JL), 60,571 votes; Ivans Klementjevs (SC), 16,914 votes; Vents Armands Krauklis (TP), 66,069 votes; Māris Kučinskis (TP), 66,092 votes; Visvaldis Lācis (ZZS), 46,857 votes; Ainars Latkovskis (JL), 55,184 votes; Ingmārs Līdaka (ZZS), 51,070 votes; Artis Pabriks (TP), 71,744 votes; Raimonds Pauls (TP), 68,045 votes; Einars Repše (JL), 56,940 votes; Mārtiņš Roze (ZZS), 49,872 votes; Anna Seile (TB/LNNK), 22,390 votes; Juris Sokolovskis (ЗаПЧЕЛ), 9,202 votes; Aigars Štokenbergs (TP), 66,206 votes; and Raimonds Vējonis (ZZS), 46,922 votes.

2002
Results of the 2002 parliamentary election held on 5 October 2002:

The following candidates were elected:
Andris Ārgalis (TP), 67,559 votes; Vilnis Edvīns Bresis (ZZS), 34,709 votes; Juris Dalbiņš (TP), 63,030 votes; Oļegs Deņisovs (ЗаПЧЕЛ), 25,013 votes; Indulis Emsis (ZZS), 34,000 votes; Ēriks Jēkabsons (LPP), 36,815 votes; Ausma Kantāne-Ziedone (JL), 79,137 votes; Andis Kāposts (ZZS), 33,988 votes; Oskars Kastēns (LPP), 34,041 votes; Arturs Krišjānis Kariņš (JL), 76,380 votes; Uldis Mārtiņš Klauss (JL), 75,190 votes; Ģirts Valdis Kristovskis (TB/LNNK), 18,823 votes; Alberts Krūmiņš (JL), 75,163 votes; Arnolds Laksa (LPP), 31,036 votes; Ainars Latkovskis (JL), 76,012 votes; Liene Liepiņa (JL), 74,811 votes; Pēteris Ontužāns (JL), 75,883 votes; Raimonds Pauls (TP), 65,661 votes; Mareks Segliņš (TP), 63,658 votes; Viesturs Šiliņš (JL), 74,788 votes; Andris Šķēle (TP), 82,070 votes; Atis Slakteris (TP), 63,833 votes; Igors Solovjovs (ЗаПЧЕЛ), 24,452 votes; Jānis Straume (TB/LNNK), 18,201 votes; Andris Tolmačovs (ЗаПЧЕЛ), 24,634 votes; and Ingrīda Ūdre (ZZS), 37,039 votes.

1990s

1998
Results of the 1998 parliamentary election held on 3 October 1998:

The following candidates were elected:
Dzintars Ābiķis (TP), 71,415 votes; Jānis Ādamsons (LSDA), 47,040 votes; Gundars Bērziņš (TP), 72,163 votes; Valdis Birkavs (LC), 58,478 votes; Gundars Bojārs (LSDA), 45,367 votes; Juris Dalbiņš (TP), 75,830 votes; Ivars Godmanis (LC), 59,680 votes; Anatolijs Gorbunovs (LC), 73,964 votes; Kārlis Greiškalns (TP), 70,259 votes; Oskars Grīgs (TB/LNNK), 43,696 votes; Arnis Kalniņš (LSDA), 37,760 votes; Imants Kalniņš (TB/LNNK), 45,557 votes; Vilis Krištopans (LC), 71,043 votes; Jānis Lagzdiņš (TP), 73,487 votes; Viola Lāzo (LSDA), 37,993 votes; Kristiāna Lībane (LC), 59,626 votes; Vladimirs Makarovs (TB/LNNK), 44,174 votes; Vaira Paegle (TP), 70,303 votes; Andrejs Panteļējevs (LC), 61,591 votes; Raimonds Pauls (JP), 28,935 votes; Aida Prēdele (TB/LNNK), 43,140 votes; Anna Seile (TB/LNNK), 45,421 votes; Andris Šķēle (TP), 96,267 votes; Ainārs Šlesers (JP), 23,008 votes; and Igors Solovjovs (TSP), 14,018 votes.

1995
Results of the 1995 parliamentary election held on 30 September and 1 October 1995:

The following candidates were elected:
Jānis Ādamsons (LC), 58,506 votes; Andris Ameriks (TSP), 7,045 votes; Raitis Apalups (LVP), 26,370 votes; Valdis Birkavs (LC), 42,968 votes; Ilmārs Bišers (DPS), 48,353 votes; Alfrēds Čepānis (DPS), 54,885 votes; Ziedonis Čevers (DPS), 54,778 votes; Roberts Dilba (LVP), 26,335 votes; Oļģerts Dunkers (TKL), 44,082 votes; Indulis Emsis (LNNK-LZP), 18,442 votes; Māris Gailis (LC), 52,718 votes; Anatolijs Gorbunovs (LC), 60,762 votes; Viesturs Gredzens (LVP), 27,735 votes; Oskars Grīgs (TB), 36,060 votes; Ojārs Grīnbergs (TKL), 45,364 votes; Guntars Grīnblats (TB), 34,386 votes; Odisejs Kostanda (TKL), 50,569 votes; Aivars Kreituss (DPS), 53,372 votes; Aida Prēdele (LZS-KDS-LDP), 15,666 votes; Pauls Putniņš (LZS-KDS-LDP), 15,864 votes; Andris Saulītis (TKL), 44,456 votes; Anna Seile (LNNK-LZP), 20,923 votes; Jānis Straume (TB), 34,468 votes; Dainis Turlais (DPS), 51,126 votes; and Juris Galerijs Vidiņš (TB), 35,527 votes.

1993
Results of the 1993 parliamentary election held on 5 and 6 June 1993:

The following candidates were elected:
Dzintars Ābiķis (LC), 107,742 votes; Georgs Andrejevs (LC), 144,682 votes; Aivars Berķis (LZS), 43,451 votes; Valdis Birkavs (LC), 114,417 votes; Inese Birzniece (LC), 108,908 votes; Olga Dreģe (DCP), 18,868 votes; Anatolijs Gorbunovs (LC), 172,762 votes; Edvīns Inkēns (LC), 121,494 votes; Imants Kalniņš (LNNK), 38,912 votes; Ojārs Kehris (LC), 110,940 votes; Edvīns Kide (SL), 23,899 votes; Aivars Kreituss (DCP), 27,096 votes; Ģirts Valdis Kristovskis (LC), 108,641 votes; Jānis Lucāns (SL), 25,955 votes; Gunārs Meierovics (LC), 119,154 votes; Valdis Pavlovskis (LC), 110,671 votes; Aleksandrs Pētersons (TB), 17,388 votes; Velta Puriņa (LNNK), 40,305 votes; Irina Rajuškina (Р), 7,439 votes; Gunārs Resnais (LZS), 37,013 votes; Andris Saulītis (KDS), 15,295 votes; Anna Seile (LNNK), 37,163 votes; Jānis Straume (TB), 17,814 votes; Guntis Ulmanis (LZS), 41,068 votes; Mārtiņš Virsis (LC), 106,488 votes; and Alfrēds Žīgurs (LNNK), 45,231 votes.

1930s

1931
Results of the 1931 parliamentary election held on 3 and 4 October 1931:

1920s

1928
Results of the 1928 parliamentary election held on 6 and 7 October 1928:

1925
Results of the 1925 parliamentary election held on 3 and 4 October 1925:

1922
Results of the 1922 parliamentary election held on 7 and 8 October 1922:

References

Saeima constituency
Saeima constituencies
Saeima constituencies established in 1922